Major General Francis J. Evon Jr. is the Adjutant General of the Connecticut National Guard. He is responsible to the Governor and the Chief, National Guard Bureau, for providing operationally trained, equipped and mission-ready forces to support both U.S. mobilization requirements and state emergency operations to include developing and coordinating counter terrorism and domestic preparedness contingencies for the State of Connecticut. He implements policies, programs, and plans as the direct link to all state assigned National Guard resources, providing information and evaluation, issue resolution and action recommendations.
General Evon began his military career in 1985 as an enlisted Anti-Tank Crewman in the Combat Support Company, 2nd Battalion, 102nd Infantry of the Connecticut Army National Guard. He was commissioned through the Army Reserve Officers’ Training Corps in 1989. Major General Evon has held command leadership positions at the company, battalion, and brigade levels. He served as commander of the 1st Battalion, 102d Infantry Regiment in Afghanistan during Operation Enduring Freedom from November 2009 to November 2010.
Prior to his current assignment, General Evon served as the assistant adjutant general for the Connecticut Army National Guard. His promotion to major general was confirmed at the federal level by the U.S. Senate on May 23, 2019.

Education
1989 Bachelor of Science, Finance, University of Connecticut, Storrs, Connecticut
2013 Master of Strategic Studies, United States Army War College, Carlisle Barracks, Carlisle, Pennsylvania

Assignments
Oct. 1989 – Nov. 1991	Rifle Platoon Leader, Company C (-), 1st Battalion, 102d Infantry, 43rd Infantry Brigade, 26th Infantry Division, Bristol, Connecticut
Nov. 1991 – Oct. 1992	Rifle Platoon Leader, Detachment 1, Company C (-), 1st Battalion, 102nd Infantry, 43rd Infantry Brigade, 26th Infantry Division, Torrington, Connecticut
Oct. 1992 – Nov. 1994	Mortar Platoon Leader, Company C, 1st Battalion, 102nd Infantry, 43rd Infantry Brigade, 26th Infantry Division, Bristol, Connecticut
Nov. 1994 – Jul. 1996	Executive Officer, Company C, 1st Battalion, 102nd Infantry, 43rd Infantry Brigade, 26th Infantry Division, Bristol, Connecticut
Jul. 1996 – Oct. 1998	Company Commander, Company C, 1st Battalion, 102nd Infantry, 43rd Infantry Brigade, 26th Infantry Division, Bristol, Connecticut
Oct. 1998 – Oct. 1999	Battalion S-1, 1st Battalion, 102nd Infantry, 43rd Infantry Brigade, 26th Infantry Division, New Haven, Connecticut
Oct. 1999 – Jan. 2001	Battalion S-4, 1st Battalion, 102nd Infantry, 43rd Infantry Brigade, 26th Infantry Division, New Haven, Connecticut
Jan. 2001 – Mar. 2002  Brigade S-2, Headquarters, 85th Troop Command, State Area Command, New London, Connecticut
Mar. 2002 – Apr. 2003  Administrative Officer, Headquarters, 169th Leadership Regiment, Connecticut Army National Guard, Niantic, Connecticut
Apr. 2003 – Jun. 2003	Assistant Operations Officer, Headquarters, 169th Leadership Regiment, Connecticut Army National Guard, Niantic, Connecticut
Jun. 2003 – Dec. 2003	Chief, Force Projection Officer, HHD STARC (-), Connecticut Army National Guard, Hartford, Connecticut
Dec. 2003 – Sep. 2007	Executive Officer, Joint Forces Headquarters, Connecticut Army National Guard, Hartford, Connecticut
Sep. 2007 – Mar. 2011  Commander, 102nd Infantry, 86th Infantry Brigade Combat Team (MTN), 42nd Infantry Division, New Haven, Connecticut
Nov. 2009 – Jan. 2011	Commander, 1st Battalion 102nd Infantry, Afghanistan
Mar. 2011 – Dec. 2011	J7/Director of Joint Training, Joint Forces Headquarters, Connecticut National Guard, Hartford, Connecticut
Dec. 2011 – Aug. 2012	Deputy Chief of Staff, Personnel/ G1, Joint Forces Headquarters, Connecticut National Guard, Hartford, Connecticut
Aug. 2012 – Oct. 2014	Commander, 85th Troop Command, Connecticut Army National Guard, Niantic, Connecticut
Oct. 2014 – Aug. 2016	Deputy Chief of Staff, Personnel/ G1, Joint Forces Headquarters, Connecticut National Guard, Hartford, Connecticut
Aug. 2016 – Jun. 2018	Assistant Adjutant General, Connecticut Joint Force Headquarters, Hartford, Connecticut
Jul. 2018 – present, The Adjutant General – Connecticut, Hartford, Connecticut

Awards and decorations

Effective dates of promotion

References

1967 births
Living people
Military personnel from Connecticut
United States Army generals
Connecticut Adjutant Generals
National Guard (United States) generals
Recipients of the Legion of Merit
Connecticut National Guard personnel